Deshonra is a 1952 Argentine film directed by Daniel Tinayre. It was the first portrayal of a lesbian love affair.

Plot
Framed and convicted of a crime she did not commit, Flora, played by Fanny Navarro is sent to prison, where she meets Roberta, played by Golde Flami, who becomes her protector and lover.

Cast
Fanny Navarro 
Golde Flami
Tita Merello 
Mecha Ortiz 
Georges Rigaud 
Aída Luz
Blanca Lagrotta

References

External links
 

1952 films
1950s Spanish-language films
Argentine black-and-white films
Lesbian-related films
Argentine crime drama films
1952 crime drama films
Films directed by Daniel Tinayre
1950s Argentine films